The Benewah Milk Bottle is a landmark in Spokane, Washington. Listed on the National Register of Historic Places, there are two constructed milk bottle-shaped buildings in the Spokane area, which accompanied a successful dairy operation's stores. One of the buildings is located on South Cedar Street in Downtown Spokane, while the other is located two miles north in the Garland Historical District of North Hill.

On the morning of September 26, 2011, the Garland Historical District Milk Bottle restaurant, owned by Mary Lou Ritchie, and the historical Ferguson's Café, located next door, were heavily damaged in a fire. Fire investigators believe the fire started in a walkway between the two restaurants.

History
The bottle was completed in 1935 and is a classic example of literalism in advertising. The bottle is stuccoed from its base to where it begins to taper to the bottle's neck. The neck and cap are sheet metal over a wooden frame. The entire bottle had an original white paint. It was Paul E. Newport who built the milk bottles. Newport owned the thriving Benewah Dairy Company. Company ads stated the bottles were "designed to build better men and women by making dairy products attractive to boys and girls. No expense will be spared to make these new stores as sturdy as fine, and as good as the products they represent."

The milk bottle was photographed by John Margolies who captured images of roadside attractions around the United States.

See also
Hood Milk Bottle
Guaranteed Pure Milk bottle
Milk Bottle Grocery

Notes

External links
 “Roadside Attractions”, a National Park Service Teaching with Historic Places (TwHP) lesson plan
Waymarking.com Photo & Information

Novelty buildings in Washington (state)
National Register of Historic Places in Spokane, Washington
Commercial buildings completed in 1935
Buildings and structures in Spokane, Washington
Roadside attractions in Washington (state)
Tourist attractions in Spokane, Washington
Commercial buildings in Washington (state)
Burned buildings and structures in the United States
Commercial buildings on the National Register of Historic Places in Washington (state)
Bottles
Milk in culture
1935 establishments in Washington (state)